Two ships of the Royal Netherlands Navy  have been named HNLMS Willem van der Zaan in honour of the 17th century Schout-bij-nacht ("Rear Admiral") Willem Van Der Zaan.

 , was a minelayer launched in 1939, and scrapped in 1970.

Royal Netherlands Navy ship names